ASVS is an initialism with following meanings:

 Advanced Space Vision System, a computer vision system designed primarily for ISS assembly
 Application Security Verification Standard, a standard to performing application-level security verifications